Dejan Savić (born 24 April 1975) is a Serbian professional water polo coach and former player.  Dejan Savić is a former head coach of the Serbian national team and  Crvena zvezda

During his playing career, he was part of two Olympic bronze medal squads, one for FR Yugoslavia at the 2000 Olympics in Sydney, the other for Serbia at the 2008 Olympics in Beijing, and one Olympic silver medal squad for Serbia and Montenegro at the 2004 Olympics in Athens.

Savić started training with the Partizan water polo club at the age of five and he debuted for the first team (seniors) at the age of thirteen, while still a pupil in elementary school. His last club was VK Crvena Zvezda where he was team captain. He retired from active playing at the end of the 2010/11 season. At international level, Savić represented FR Yugoslavia, Serbia and Montenegro and Serbia, in 444 matches and scored 405 goals. He is the most capped player in Serbian water polo.

He began coaching VK Crvena Zvezda in 2011 and stayed there until 2015. He also became head coach of the Serbia men's national water polo team in autumn 2012 and stayed until 2023.

Club career as coach

Crvena Zvezda
In 2011, after finishing his long playing career, Savić remained with his club Crvena zvezda in the position of head coach. In 2015, Savić left the position in Crvena zvezda. In February 2022, he returned to Crvena zvezda as head cocach.

National career
Savić is one of a few sportspeople who won Olympic medals in water polo as players and head coaches.

As player
Savić made his debut for the national team in 1994, during a time of sanctions for Yugoslavia, following All-Star selections in a tournament in Italy. He became the standard no. five (wing) player for the team almost without a break over the whole of his national career. Holding the record for the highest number of matches played (444), and also being a highly successful scorer (405 goals), he is considered to be among the true legends of Serbian sports. During his career,  he developed into the strongest pillar of Serbia's defense in front of the goal. With his power and imagination, he was a prominent member of the team. From 1997, Savić was part of the Yugoslav/Serbian water polo team in every competition in which they won a medal. In a duel with Montenegro at the 2008 Olympic Games, he was one of the players most responsible for Serbia's triumph when they won the bronze medal that year. Savić played his last match with the national team in China in 2011.

As coach
Savić was named as head coach of the Serbian National team after Dejan Udovičić left the position in 2012. Under Savić's leadership, the national team won the 2020 and 2016 Olympic Games, the 2015 World Championship, three European Championships (2014, 2016 and 2018), and six World League titles (2013, 2014, 2015, 2016, 2017 and 2019). In little over twelve months, between August 2015 and August 2016, the Serbian National team won consecutively all four of the biggest titles in Water Polo – the 2015 World Championship, the 2016 European Championship, the 2016 World League, and the 2016 and 2020 Olympic Games – an unprecedented achievement.

Honours

As coach

VK Crvena Zvezda
 LEN Champions League: 2012–13
 Serbian Championship: 2012–13, 2013–14
 Serbian Cup: 2012–13,  2013–14
 Regional A2 League: 2017–18
 LEN Super Cup: 2014

As player

VK Partizan
 Yugoslavian Championship: 1994–95
 Yugoslavia Cup: 1989–90, 1990–91, 1991–92, 1992–93, 1993–94, 1994–95
 LEN Cup:  1997–98
 LEN Super Cup: 1991
 LEN Cup Winners' Cup: 1990
 Mediterranean Championship: 1989

CN Barcelona
 Copa del Rey: 1998–9

CN Atlètic-Barceloneta
 Spanish Championship: 2000–01
 Copa del Rey: 2000–01
 Supercopa de España: 2001

Rari Nantes Florentia
 LEN Cup Winners' Cup: 2001

Pro Recco
 LEN Super Cup: 2004

Sintez Kazan
 Russian Championship: 2006–07
Russian Cup: 2004–05, 2009–10
 LEN Euro Cup: 2006–07

Individual honours
It was announced on 1 June 2010 that Dejan Savić won the national sports award, which includes lifetime monthly fees. Savić was honored for winning a silver medal at the 2004 Olympic Games in Athens.

See also
 Serbia men's Olympic water polo team records and statistics
 Serbia and Montenegro men's Olympic water polo team records and statistics
 List of Olympic champions in men's water polo
 List of Olympic medalists in water polo (men)
 List of players who have appeared in multiple men's Olympic water polo tournaments
 List of world champions in men's water polo
 List of World Aquatics Championships medalists in water polo

References

 Interview

External links

 

1975 births
Living people
Sportspeople from Belgrade
Yugoslav male water polo players
Serbia and Montenegro male water polo players
Serbian male water polo players
Water polo centre backs
Water polo players at the 1996 Summer Olympics
Water polo players at the 2000 Summer Olympics
Water polo players at the 2004 Summer Olympics
Water polo players at the 2008 Summer Olympics
Olympic water polo players of Yugoslavia
Olympic water polo players of Serbia and Montenegro
Olympic bronze medalists for Federal Republic of Yugoslavia
Olympic silver medalists for Serbia and Montenegro
Olympic bronze medalists for Serbia in water polo
Medalists at the 2000 Summer Olympics
Medalists at the 2004 Summer Olympics
Medalists at the 2008 Summer Olympics
World Aquatics Championships medalists in water polo
European champions for Serbia
Competitors at the 1997 Mediterranean Games
Mediterranean Games medalists in water polo
Mediterranean Games gold medalists for Yugoslavia
Universiade medalists in water polo
Universiade gold medalists for Serbia and Montenegro
Serbian water polo coaches
Serbia men's national water polo team coaches
Water polo coaches at the 2016 Summer Olympics
Water polo coaches at the 2020 Summer Olympics
Serbian expatriate sportspeople in Italy
Serbian expatriate sportspeople in Russia
Serbian expatriate sportspeople in Spain